Dean Butler OAM (born 26 January 1977 in Warwick, Queensland) is a field hockey defender from Australia, who was a member of the team that won the gold medal at the 2004 Summer Olympics in Athens.

He is nicknamed Butts, and played club hockey for the Queensland Blades in his native country, with whom he won the national title in 2003. Butler was promoted to the senior squad following the 1998 Men's Hockey World Cup. In 2001 he was named Player of the Year in Queensland.

References
 Profile on Hockey Australia

External links
 

1977 births
Australian male field hockey players
Olympic field hockey players of Australia
Male field hockey defenders
Field hockey players at the 2004 Summer Olympics
2002 Men's Hockey World Cup players
2006 Men's Hockey World Cup players
Recipients of the Medal of the Order of Australia
People from Warwick, Queensland
Living people
Olympic gold medalists for Australia
Commonwealth Games gold medallists for Australia
Field hockey players at the 2006 Commonwealth Games
Olympic medalists in field hockey
Medalists at the 2004 Summer Olympics
Commonwealth Games medallists in field hockey
Medallists at the 2006 Commonwealth Games